Albina may refer to:

Places
 Albina, Suriname, a city in Suriname
 Albina, Oregon, a city annexed by Portland, Oregon, US
 Albina, Brăila, a village in Tichilești Commune, Brăila County, Romania
 Albina, Timiș, a village in Moșnița Nouă Commune, Timiș County, Romania
 Albina, Vaslui, a village in Ivănești Commune, Vaslui County, Romania
 Albina, Cimişlia, a commune in Raionul Cimişlia, Moldova

People etc.
 Albina (given name), people with the name "Albina"
 Albina (mythology), a figure in Etruscan mythology
 Albina, legendary ancestor of the giants of Albion
 Saint Albina

Other uses
 One of the Russian space dogs
 Albina Românească, Romanian-language bi-weekly political and literary magazine, printed in Iaşi, Moldavia
 Appias albina, butterfly found in India